Kaikhosro III Gurieli (died ) was a member of the Georgian family of Gurieli, a princely dynasty of Guria. He was briefly Prince-regnant of Guria as a rival to his brother Giorgi IV Gurieli in 1716. In 1724, he emigrated to the Russian Empire, where he commanded the Georgian Hussar Regiment in the 1740s.

Kaikhosro was the second son of Mamia III Gurieli, Prince of Guria, and Elene, daughter of Giorgi-Malakia Abashidze. He was a monk in 1716, when Elene engineered a coup against his own son, Giorgi IV Gurieli, whom she deposed with the help of Mingrelian and Imeretian troops and installed Kaikhosro as prince of Guria. Next year, Giorgi was able to resume his rule with the help of Ottoman pasha of Erzurum; Elene and Kaikhosro fled to Kartli under the protection of King Vakhtang VI, whose mother Tuta was Kaikhosro's grandfather's sister. 

In 1724, Kaikhosro and his wife followed Vakhtang VI in his exile into Russia occasioned by the Ottoman invasion of Kartli. Known in Russia as Kaikhosro Matveyevich Gurielov, he was enlisted in the Georgian Hussar Regiment in 1738 and granted an estate in the Poltava Governorate. In 1741, he was promoted to the rank of podpolkovnik and placed in command of the Georgian Hussar Regiment. He retired in 1751. Kaikhosro's Russia-born son Stepan (1730–1812) and grandson Ivan (1770–1818) were major-generals of the Imperial Russian Army. With Ivan's death, the Gurieli's Russian branch went extinct in a male line; Kaikhosro's female-line descendants sought the right to carry the surname of Gurieli into their families in the 19th century, but to no avail.

References 

1750s deaths
House of Gurieli
Year of birth unknown
18th-century people from Georgia (country)
Expatriates from Georgia (country) in Russia
18th-century military personnel from the Russian Empire